Tölök (also Кең-Суу Keng-Suu) is a village in Naryn Region of Kyrgyzstan. It is part of the Kochkor District. Its population was 1,883 in 2021.

References
 

Populated places in Naryn Region